Summer Evening at Skagen Beach – The Artist and his Wife is an 1899 painting by Peder Severin Krøyer. One of the best known paintings of the Skagen Painters, it depicts Krøyer with his wife Marie and his dog Rap strolling on the beach in the moonlight.

Background

The Skagen Painters were a close-knit group of mainly Danish artists who gathered each summer from the late 1870s in the fishing village of Skagen in the far north of Jutland, painting the local fishermen and their own gatherings. P. S. Krøyer arrived there in 1882, quickly becoming the most prominent member of the group.

In 1895, in a letter to his friend Oscar Björck, Krøyer wrote "I am also thinking of painting a large portrait of my wife and me together — but for that I shall definitely need good weather, so it won't be this year." In fact it was four years later, in the summer of 1899, that he finally created his large painting. Maybe it was in recognition of 10 years of marriage with Marie Triepcke as illustrated in other works of family life at the time as well as in a number of the photographs and sketches he used as a basis for the work.

Painting description

The final result nevertheless has a rather melancholic tone. Despite the beautiful surroundings, Marie appears distant, disappearing into the blue moonlight. Even Krøyer's own weak figure seems to be experiencing difficulty in supporting her on his arm while the closest figure of all is Krøyer's faithful dog, Rap. After Krøyer had worked on the painting throughout the summer, he submitted it to the Charlottenborg Spring Exhibition in 1900. It was not very well received there, being criticized as banal. In fact, it presents the blue half-light, a favourite with the Symbolists who believed the twilight hour heralded the coming of death. In 1907, Krøyer conveyed his own feelings about Skagen evenings: "Skagen can look so terribly dull in the bright sunlight ... but when the sun goes down, when the moon rises up out of the sea, ... with the fishermen standing on the beach and the cutters sailing by with loosened sails ... in recent years this has been the time I like most of all." A few months after the spring exhibition, Krøyer was admitted to Middelfart Mental Hospital after suffering a nervous breakdown.

References

Further reading

1899 paintings
Paintings by Peder Severin Krøyer
Paintings in the Hirschsprung Collection
Dogs in art
Ships in art
Moon in art